Gulabrao Raghunathrao Patil (Marathi: गुलाबराव रघुनाथराव पाटील) (16 September 1921 – 21 January 1989) was a Renowned Co-operative Leader, Member of Parliament (MP)-Rajya Sabha India, Maharashtra State Sangli from 1966 to 1978,Member of the Legislative Council (MLC) of Maharashtra 1983−87 and president of Maharashtra Pradesh Congress(I) Committee 1981−82. Patil also served as chairman of Maharashtra State Co-operative Bank in Mumbai from 1980 to 1982, chairman of Sangli District Cooperative Bank Sangli and Secretary of National Co-operative Union of India (NCUI), New Delhi. 
Gulabrao Patil was regarded as a Maratha Strongman in Maharashtra politics in the 1970s and 1980s. Year 2020-2021 is going to celebrate as Birth Centenary Year of Late. Gulabrao Patil (1921-2021)

Introduction

Patil was a social worker and a leader of Cooperative from Sangli in state of Maharashtra, India. For his work in the cooperative movement in Maharashtra, he was granted the title of Sahakar-Tapasavi by his supporters. He served as a Member of Parliament in Rajya Sabha (upper house of Indian Parliament) for two terms from 1966 to 1972 and 1972−1978. He was the president of Maharashtra Pradesh Congress(I)-MPCC from 1981 to 1982. Later in his life, he served in the Maharashtra State  Member of the Legislative Council- MLC for four years during the period from 1983 to 1987.

Patil also served as chairman of Maharashtra State Co-operative Bank in Mumbai from 1980 to 1982  and Secretary of National Co-operative Union of India (NCUI) from 1973 to 1975, located in New Delhi. He traveled worldwide on behalf of Indian Government to study Co-operative Movements and Agriculture in different countries such as the United States, Great Britain, Korea, and Germany.

Early life

Gulabrao Patil was born on 16 September 1921 in a reputed Maratha family in Benadi, a famous village on the Maharashtra-Karnataka state border near Kolhapur and Sangli districts. He obtained his BA(English) and LLB(Special) from Kolhapur Law college. After graduation, he started practicing law in the city of Satara. At the urging of the veteran political leader, Yashwantrao Chavan, Gulabrao moved to Sangli city. He first practiced law there but then took interest in regional politics and joined the Indian National Congress during Indian Independence. He worked along with leaders like Yashwantrao Chavan- 1st Chief Minister of Maharashtra, Balasaheb Desai – former Home minister of Maharashtra and other such leaders in initiating Co-operative Movement in western Maharashtra especially in Sangli and Kolhapur Districts.

Social work and co-operative movement

After Indian independence, Patil worked on solving agriculture problems in Western Maharashtra. He established a number of  Co-operative societies in nearby palaces of Sangli. In 1951, he was first elected as a member of local council, followed by Mayor of Sangli city in 1954–55. As a mayor, he undertook many development initiatives for the city, including the installment of the Hirabagh water pipeline for the entire Sangli city. He was secretary of District Planning Committee of newly formed Sangli District in 1960.

In the 1960s, Gulabrao got inspired by the work of Vaikunthbhai Mehta and Dhananjayrao Gadgil, both great leaders of Indian Cooperative movement. Patil believed that 'Sahakar' i.e. cooperative movement is main source of upliftment for the society and economic growth. Later he dedicated his entire life for strengthening Cooperative Movement in Post Independence era of India. He worked along with leaders such as Barrister G.D.Patil, Vasantdada Patil, Anandrao Chavan, Rajarambapu Patil, Aabasaheb Shinde-Maisalkar, Yashwantrao Mohite, Tataysaheb Kore, V. T. Patil and many more.

Co-operative banks and education
Patil was instrumental in establishing and developing Sangli District Central Cooperative Bank (SDCC) where he served as a chairman and Director for over two decades. During his tenure he took many brave decisions for economical development of farmers. As the  SDCC chairman, he financially supported many cooperative sugar factories in the region. He was first chairman of SDCC Bank to promote and disburse agricultural loans to farmers for growing sugarcane and seedless grapes in Sangli district. Today, Sangli District is one of the leading sugarcane and grape producing regions in India. In 1965, he started Sangli District Cooperative Board for basic education and training in Co-operatives. Now named Gulabrao Patil Cooperative Training Center, it is located at Sahakar Bhavan, Market Yard, in Sangli city. He made valuable efforts to increase irrigation scheme for agriculture via co-operative societies in Sangli district. In 1980, Patil was elected as chairman of Maharashtra State Cooperative Bank, Mumbai-an apex organisation of Co-operative banks in Maharashtra. During his tenure as chairmanship, MSC Bank was leading cooperative bank in the country. Patil also served as chairman of Maharashtra State Cooperative Union in Pune. He was also general secretary of National Cooperative Union of India – an apex body of Indian cooperatives. Made valuable contribution in promoting and strengthening the co-operative education and training in Maharashtra state.

Also, Patil had set up cooperative housing societies in Pune and Sangli cities known as Gulabnagar Coop Housing Society, Dhanakawadi and Gulab Colony, Near Chandni Chowk Sangli respectively.

Politics

Patil was mainly active in cooperative sector but like most other leaders of Maharashtra during that era, he became active in state and national politics. He served as Member of Indian Parliament for 12 years and was president of Maharashtra Congress. In 1978, he joined the Indira Gandhi led Congress(I), where he was one of the first from Maharashtra to join Congress(I) at that time. Soon in 1981, Indira Gandhi appointed Patil as president of Maharashtra Pradesh Congress(I) Committee. In next general election Congress(I) won by big margin in Maharashtra under his leadership.

Patil contested Maharashtra Assembly Election in 1980 from Walva Constituency, Sangli District. Although he lost the election by small margin, he was acclaimed and emerged as strong Congress leader from Sangli-Western Maharashtra. He was elected as president of Maharashtra Pradesh Congress Committee (MPCC) in 1981. Later he was elected as Member of the Legislative Council- MLC in 1983-1987 Maharashtra Government for four years.

As a Member of Parliament Patil made a special effort to establish Marathi Film City-Chitranagari in Kolhapur together with his cousin, Marathi film director, Dinkar D. Patil. Also, he put forward the issue of Belgaum border dispute during his term as MP in Rajya Sabha.

Patil was appointed as 1st president of Sanjay Gandhi Niradhar Yojana, where he was granted Cabinet Ministership status. During his tenure as chairman of Sanjay Ganghi Niradhar Yojana, he took a decision to pay pension to unfounded, baseless people, Niradhar widows. Maharashtra was the first state to adopt such policy under his leadership, this Scheme is still successfully operating in Maharashtra Government.

In 1983 G.R Patil was appointed as chairman of the Committee for The Rehabilitation of Financial Weak Sugar Factories of Maharashtra, his recommendations helped in reestablishing many sugar factories; this transparent report on Sugar Factories is still considered as most reliable referral today in Maharashtra State.

Split in Congress
In end of 1978 at Bangalore Annual Congress Session, Congress split into two namely; Congress (Indira) and Congress (Urs). Leader who joined Urs Congress were Devaraj Urs, Kasu Brahmananda Reddy, A.K. Antony, Sharad Pawar, and Yashwantrao Chavan. On other side, Indira Gandhi established her own party as Congress (I), where leaders like Shankar Dayal Sharma, Umashankar Dixit, Kamruddin Ali Ahmad, Shri. C. Subramanian, Barrister A.R. Antule, Gulabrao Patil were pioneer leaders who joined Congress(I). Congress (Urs) disintegrated and Devaraj Urs joined Janata Party. The Congress (Urs) was renamed as Congress (Socialist). In next general election in 1980, Congress (I) won majority in Central Government and came into power, also in Maharashtra, Congress(I) formed its government appointing A.R. Antule as Chief Minister and Gulabrao Patil as Congress chief. Gulabrao Patil was appointed as Member of Parliamentary Board of Congress (I) by Smt. Indira Gandhi.

Candidate for post of Chief Minister of Maharashtra and decline of ministership 

After resignation of Chief Minister A R Antulay in 1982, Patil was the leading candidate of next chief minister of Maharashtra at that time as he was president of Maharashtra State Congress and close associate of Indira Gandhi. But at last moment his name was dropped due to internal politics. In next government of Babasaheb Bhosale, Patil was offered a position which was at the lower rank of being a  State Minister rather than a full cabinet post. Gulabrao rejected the offer and famously said, Power without Prestige, is a Gun without Bullets. After assassination of Indira Gandhi, Gulabrao Patil supported Rajiv Gandhi at Central Politics. He served as a cooperative leader and loyal Congressman until his death on 21 January 1989 at age of 67.

Legacy
In memory of Patil two social trusts are established in Sangli and Miraj cities. Gulabrao Patil Memorial Trust(GPMT), Sangli-Miraj was established in 1991 and Gulabrao Patil Lokseva Vishvastha Nidhi, Sangli was established in 1981. The main objective of setting up these trusts are to, perpetuate memory of Mr. Patil by acknowledging his rich, outstanding and valuable contribution in cooperative movement and social development of Maharashtra and to undertake social activities and education programmes particularly for the elevation of common man. On behalf of these charitable trusts number of social and cultural activities are undertaken in Sangli and Miraj regions. Also, every year on his birthday, the  Gulabrao Patil Sahakar Gaurav Puraskar (Award) is given for outstanding work in cooperative field.  This award was 1st awarded to the then Chief Minister of Maharashtra Vilasrao Deshmukh in 2001.

Statues and memorials

On 21 January 2013, Sangli District Central Co-operative Banks craftsman Late. Patil's full size bronze statue was unveiled by Prithviraj Chavan, Then Chief Minister, Maharashtra.

Other statues of Patil are in Maharashtra State Cooperative Union, Pune and Sangli District Cooperative Board, Sangli. A memorial park is planned to open at Sangli and Miraj cities for promoting cooperatives values at regional and state level.

Heirs
At present, one of Gulabrao Patil's sons Prithviraj Gulabrao Patil, is socially and politically active and expanding the social and educational work of his father, he is founder chairman of Gulabrao Patil Education Institutes Miraj-Sangli and city president of Sangli District Congress Committee. Another son Shivraj Patil, now deceased, was a director of Sangli District Cooperative Board and Press. His grandsons, Ruturaj Shivraj Patil is a Certified Management Consultant, director of Sangli District Cooperative Board, also he was elected as university representative-UR of Willingdon College, Sangli (2003−04). Another grandson Virendra Prithviraj Patil is pursuing LLB, Trustee GPMT, Miraj

Educational institutes
Prithviraj Patil has established different educational institutes and social project are undertaken through Gulabrao Patil Memorial Trust(GPMT). Colleges such as Homeopathy, Pharmacy, Nursing, B.Ed., D.Ed., IT Training center and Cambridge English School and Junior College, CBSE and State Board, Cambridge IIT and Medical Academy are run in Miraj and Sangli Cities. Gulabrao Patil Pathsauntha is established for economical and social upliftment of needy. Prithviraj Patil contested MLA Election from Sangli Constituency on Congress Ticket in year 2019.

References and further reading 

 Gulabrao Patil Member of Parliament-https://rajyasabha.nic.in/rsnew/member_site/Main.aspx
 Gulabrao Patil See PDF page 10- http://rajyasabha.nic.in/rsnew/pre_member/1952_2003/p.pdf
 MPCC Congress Committee- http://mahacongress.com/ http://mahacongress.com/eng/past-president/
 Patil Articles in News Paper-https://picasaweb.google.com/112276088204735368470/GulabraoPatilByRuturajPatil  
 Former chairman Sangli District Cooperative Bank Website- http://www.sanglidccbank.com/en/abtListOfFormerChairman.aspx
 Maharashtra State Cooperative Bank Photo Gallery- https://www.mscbank.com/history.aspx
 Gulabrao Patil Memorial Trust- http://www.gpmtedu.org/Default.aspx
 NCUI Cooperative Website- https://ncui.coop/co-operative-history/

References

1921 births
Members of the Maharashtra Legislative Council
People from Sangli
1989 deaths
Rajya Sabha members from Maharashtra
Marathi politicians
People from Belagavi district
Mayors of Sangli